The Gruyere Gold Mine is a gold mine located  east-north-east of Laverton. It is jointly-owned by the South African mining company Gold Fields, who manages the operation, and Australian company Gold Road Resources.

As of 2022, it is one of four mines Gold Fields operates in Australia, the others being the Agnew Gold Mine, the Granny Smith Gold Mine and the St Ives Gold Mine. Mining at Gruyere is carried out in an open pit operation.

The mine is located on the traditional land of the Yilka people. Its location east of Cosmo Newbery, along the Great Central Road, is considerably further east then the majority of gold mines in the Goldfields–Esperance regions, with the Tropicana Gold Mine being the only active gold mine east of Gruyere in the region.

History
The Gruyere deposit was discovered by Gold Road Resources in October 2013, 25 km north-east of its previous exploration area in the Yamarna belt. Because of its remoteness and distance form the local mining centre, Kalgoorlie, the area had been historically poorly explored for resources.

In November 2016, Gold Road announced that it would sell 50 percent of the Gruyere project to South African mining company Gold Fields for A$350 million in cash. Additionally, Gold Road would also receive a 1.5 percent net smelter return royalty on production above 2 million ounces. Under this agreement, Gold Fields would manage the project while Gold Road would be responsible for exploration activities on the Gruyere tenements.

Mining at Gruyere is being carried out in an open pit operation, with a reported initial resource of 3.8 million ounces of gold, later expanded to 6.51 million ounces, the latter at a grade of 1.33 grams per tonne. In October 2021, it was announced that the depth of the pit was to be extended to 500 metres, which would make it one of the deepest open cut gold operations in Australia. The increased depth would extend the mine life of the open pit operations to 2032, with a proposed annual production of 350,000 ounces.

Construction of the Gruyere Gold Mine commenced in 2017 and was completed in 2019, at a cost of A$621 million and six years after the deposit's discovery. First gold was delivered in the June 2019 quarter. The official opening of the mine was on 3 December 2019. During the construction period, the mine employed 700 people, with the work force reduced to 250 for operations.

While Gruyere's relatively quick development from discovery to production, six years in comparison to the eight for the Tropicana Gold Mine, was hailed as a success, concerns were raised about the lack of new major gold deposit discoveries in Western Australia. Prior to Gruyere, Tropicana had been the last in 2005 and, at the time of the opening of Gruyere in 2019, no other large discovery had been made. This fact raised concerns in the state's gold industry about being able to maintain production rates.

, it is one of four mines Gold Fields operates in Australia, the others being the Agnew Gold Mine, the Granny Smith Gold Mine and the St Ives Gold Mine, with a combined production of 1,053,000 ounces of gold in 2021.

Production
Annual production of the mine:

References

External links 
 
 MINEDEX website: Yamarna - Gruyere JV Database of the Department of Mines, Industry Regulation and Safety

Gold mines in Western Australia
Shire of Laverton
Surface mines in Australia
2019 establishments in Australia
Gold Fields